17 Vulpeculae is a single, blue-white hued star in the northern constellation of Vulpecula. The star is faintly visible to the naked eye with an apparent visual magnitude of 5.08.

This is an ordinary B-type main-sequence star with a stellar classification of B3 V. It is just 11 million years old with a high projected rotational velocity of 115 km/s. The star has an estimated 6.1 times the mass of the Sun and around 3.9 times the Sun's radius. It is radiating  573 times the Sun's luminosity from its photosphere at an effective temperature of 15,648 K.

References

B-type main-sequence stars
Vulpecula
Durchmusterung objects
Vulpeculae, 17
190993
099080
7688